Braal may refer to one of three different usages:

Braal Castle, in Caithness, Scotland
Braal (planet), a fictional world from the DC Comics Legion of Super-Heroes series.
Braal (band), a comedy rock band from San Francisco, California.